New Album is a 2011 album by Boris.

New Album may also refer to:

The New Album, an album by the Everly Brothers, 1977
The New Album, an album by Blackstratblues, 2009
Lena: A New Album, an album by Lena Horne, 1976
Tormé: A New Album, an album by Mel Tormé, 1977

See also
Art release, the premiere of an artistic production
New (album), by Paul McCartney, 2013
New (EP), by Regurgitator, 1995